The 1966 Cal Poly Pomona Broncos football team represented California State Polytechnic College, Kellogg-Voorhis—now known as California State Polytechnic University, Pomona—as an independent during the 1966 NCAA College Division football season. Led by Don Warhurst in his tenth and final season as head coach, Cal Poly Pomona compiled a record of 5–5. The team outscored its opponents 264 to 263 for the season. The Broncos played home games at Kellogg Field in Pomona, California.

Warhurst finished his tenure at Cal Poly Pomona with an overall record of 56–33–2, for a .626 winning percentage. The school joined the California Collegiate Athletic Association (CCAA) in 1967, but the football team's games did not count as conference play until 1969 as the Broncos did not play a full conference schedule in 1967 and 1968.

Schedule

References

Cal Poly Pomona
Cal Poly Pomona Broncos football seasons
Cal Poly Pomona Broncos football